Zhenhai  is a district and former county of the sub-provincial city of Ningbo in Zhejiang Province in eastern China. It has a population of 200,000.

History

The British captured Zhenhai on 10 October 1841 during the First Opium War, dismantling its former citadel. The Zhenhai Coastal Battery was the site of the 1885 Battle of Zhenhai during the Sino-French War.

Zhenhai has suffered severe long-term air pollution mainly emanating from the Ningbo Petro-Chemical Economic and Technical Development Zone built on its eastern coast. The zone is home to  nearly 200 chemical plants including Zhenhai Refining and Chemical Corporation (ZRCC), a subsidiary of Sinopec and the largest oil refinery in China, LG-Yongxing, the largest ABS plastic producer in China and Zhenhai Port Liquid Chemical Dock, the largest liquid chemical dock in China. In September, 2007, 400 tones of acrylonitrile leaked from the LG-Yongxing plant and polluted air and underground water around adjacent areas. In late April, 2012, three million bees died in an orchard in Xiepu Town next to the Petro-Chemical Zone because of pollutants discharged by a chemical plant. Research has shown that the ratio of deaths from cancer in Zhenhai rose significantly between 2007 and 2009.

From May16 to 17, 2002, residents in Zhenhai launched protests against environmental degradation caused by the chemical industry, blocking the district's traffic on its main streets. In October, 2012, angry people staged demonstrations against a giant petro-chemical project scheduled by ZRCC and clashed with police. The 50 billion yuan ($8 billion) integrated investment project, according to some reports, will affect more than 9800 households. Many argue that the environment in Zhenhai has been tremendously overloaded and the new project will bring even more harm to the ecosystem.

Administrative divisions
Subdistricts:
Zhaobaoshan Subdistrict (招宝山街道), Jiaochuan Subdistrict (蛟川街道), Luotuo Subdistrict (骆驼街道), Zhuangshi Subdistrict (庄市街道)

Towns:
Jiulonghu (九龙湖镇), Xiepu (澥浦镇)

Notable individuals 

 Hu Zongnan
 Run Run Shaw
 Yang Fujia
 Ye Chengzhong

Notes

References
 .
 .

Geography of Ningbo
Districts of Zhejiang